Young Chef Olympiad is an International Cooking Competition based in India founded by Dr. Suborno Bose. It is currently in its 5th season.

kyak pa 1

The International kyak pa Olympiad 2015 was held in the city of Kolkata, India. The Ministry of Tourism (India), Government of India supported the world’s first such event. The event was declared open at the City Centre (Salt Lake City, Kolkata) on 29 January 2015. All the participating countries namely United States, UK, Spain, France, Switzerland, China, Malaysia, Thailand, Myanmar, Kenya, Zimbabwe, Sri Lanka, Bangladesh, Bhutan and India, marched in to the arena with their country flags, supported by their teams and to unceasing applause from the crowd.

India was represented by Ms. Dhriti Verma, 3rd year student of IIHM Jaipur. Chief Guest for the evening, Mr. Scott Furssedonn Wood, the British Deputy High Commissioner in Kolkata, wished luck to the participants. Dr. Suborno Bose, founder of Young Chef Olympiad concept and chairman of the organizing committee of the event and Chief Mentor of International Institute of Hotel Management unveiled the YCO trophy and declared the Olympiad open.

The YCO oath was taken by Dhriti of India on behalf of all the participants. The Olympiad torch was carried to the arena by Garima Poddar, winner of the Young Chef India Schools 2014 contest held in London, and along with all the contestants lit up the main torch positioned on the top of the cake under the supervision of the Culinary Director of IIHM Chef Sanjay Kak. The lighting of the flames was followed by the cake cutting ceremony.

The 15 participants were Dylan from USA, Leo from France, Marcin from Spain, Marlon from China, Sumaiya from Bangladesh, Ian from Kenya, Indra from Bhutan, Tadiwa from Zimbabwe, Harsha from Sri Lanka, Ryan Ogier from Switzerland, Jennipha from Thailand, Tajinder from UK, Htoo from Myanmar, Ashwin from Malaysia and Dhriti from India. They had to compete against each other for the top 8 positions on 30 January in the preliminary and elimination round. They had to cook with the given ingredients, within a specified time. They were marked on creativity, hygiene, taste and optimum utilization of the ingredients.

The team of judges was headed by Prof. David Foskett – Head, London School of Hospitality and Tourism, University of West London, UK along with Chef Kunal Kapur of the Master Chef India fame, noted food critic and writer – Chef Karen Anand, Italian Master Chef Roberto Boggio, and Chef Shaun Kenworthy.

The final was a contest between Spain, Malaysia, Switzerland, Thailand, UK, Kenya, France and India.

In the competitive finals the contestants were asked to cook vegetarian dishes which was challenging for contestants from France and Spain as they were not trained to cook such dishes.

The winner was Ashwin from Malaysia, followed by 1st runner up Marcin from Spain and 2nd runner up Tajinder from UK. Judges introduced an award for the Outstanding Dish as well and was given to Ian from Kenya.

Ashwin, the 2015 Young Chef Olympiad winner, was awarded a cash prize of $10,000 USD, the YCO trophy and a gold medal.

Season 2

The 2nd International Young Chef Olympiad 2016, supported by Ministry of Tourism (India), Government of India, organized by International Institute of Hotel Management was held across 4 cites, Delhi, Mumbai, Bangalore and Kolkata and saw a participation from over 50 countries around the world. 

The opening ceremony was held at the Talkatora Stadium, Delhi on 27 January 2016. Students from various Delhi schools performed at the opening ceremony of YCO 2016.

The countries were divided into 3 groups for the round 1 of the competition.  Round 1 at Delhi was held on 28 January 2016 at the IIHM, Delhi Campus and Group 2 and 3 flew to Mumbai and Bangalore for their Round 1 which was held on 29 January 2016. Round 1 at Mumbai was held at the Mumbai Cricket Association, Bandra Kurla Complex and Bangalore Round 1 was held at the Royal Orchid Hotel. Round 2 & the Grand Finale was held at the IIHM, Salt Lake campus, Kolkata.

There was a distinguished panel of Judges to judge the competition headed by Dr. David Foskett, who has been the dean and head of the London School of Hospitality and Tourism at the University of West London, and is the chairman of the YCO jury.

The jury also had Chef Sanjeev Kapoor who is the principal judge and YCO mentor. Other panel members were Chef Kunal Kapur, Chef Andreas Muller, Chef Udo Leick, Chef Manjit Singh Gill, Chef Karen Anand, Chef Abhijit Saha and Chef Shaun Kenworthy.

After Round 2, 11 countries were selected for the final. They were UAE, Finland, Switzerland, France, Mexico, Kenya, Canada, Mauritius, Romania, USA & Hong Kong.

The Award & Closing Ceremony was held at the Wet-O-Wild ground of Nicco Park. Usha Uthup was the star performer of the night. The joint second runner-up was Johan Kurkela from Finland & Fernando Andres Guajardo Moguel from Mexico. The first runner-up was Gabriela Aleksandrova Hristova  from UAE.

The winner of the 2nd International Young Chef Olympiad 2016 was Daniella Garmond from Canadian Food & Wine Institute, Ontario, Canada. The trophy and cash prize of USD 10,000 was presented by Dr. Suborno Bose. The panel of Judges and Chef Ranveer Brar was present while the award was given.

Commenting on the event, Dr. Suborno Bose, Chairman of the Young Chef Olympiad and CEO-IIHM, said, “We are delighted at the global participation this year. It is a fantastic event that will reach out globally to as many countries as possible. Food has always been the biggest unifier and continues to be so in today’s day and age. YCO has connected talent across borders from the best culinary colleges under one roof making it a truly global event. Connecting the students from India with world class chefs from across the globe will not only bridge bonds but will also lay foundation of a global connect that will go a long way in each of their careers. The YCO will not only produce and refine the best talent amongst the young chefs but will also give the young talent a platform to learn, teach, showcase and network with.”

Season 3

The 3rd International Young Chef Olympiad 2017, supported by Ministry of Tourism (India), Government of India, organized by International Institute of Hotel Management was held across 4 cites, Delhi, Pune, Bangalore and Kolkata and saw a participation from over 45 countries around the world.  

The opening ceremony was held at the Talkatora Stadium, Delhi on 28 January 2017. Students from various Delhi schools performed at the opening ceremony of YCO 2017. The young chefs were divided into 3 groups and they battled it out in 3 rounds across 4 cities of Delhi, Bangalore, Pune & Kolkata.   

The ten finalist countries, after completing 3 rounds, were Australia, Canada, England, India, Malaysia, Mexico, Myanmar, Philippines, Singapore and Sri Lanka.

Tham Jiajun Mathew from Sunrice Global Chef Academy, Singapore was the winner of Young Chef Olympiad 2017.

Padma Shri Sanjeev Kapoor with Prof. David Foskett and Dr. Suborno Bose presented the Trophy and a cash prize of $10,000 to Tham Jiajun Mathew at the closing ceremony in Kolkata on 2 February 2017.

1st runner up was Andrew Ou Kai Peng from Malaysia  and 2nd runner up was Selah Schmoll from Canada. 

Tham Jiajun Mathew, Singapore said, “I want to thank everybody who has been through this journey with me. Especially my chef and my family. They helped me a lot. When I first came here, I just came to do what I do best."

His mentor, Satish Madaan commented, “I am happy that IIHM in India organized such a big event where these students can show their talent and learn from each other across the world, we are really happy for Matthew, he followed all the techniques we taught him. We will definitely be coming back next year."

Luigi Amaduzzi from Alma La Scuola Internazionale Di Cucina Italiana, Italy was awarded the Dr. Zenobia Nadirshaw Award for the 'Most Inspiring Young Chef'. Puja Mishra of IIHM, India won the Late Shrimati Shakuntala Devi Award for the Best Vegetarian Dish which also carried a cash prize of $500. Jack Gameson from University College Birmingham, England won the Morde Best Dessert Award. Tham Jiajun Mathew also won the award for Best Hygiene Practice.

Dr. Suborno Bose, Founder & Chief Mentor of IndiSmart Group & IIHM, said, "Young Chef Olympiad was conceptualized as a platform for young chefs-in-training from around the world to interact and showcase their talent. We are very glad to see a great response from the international community, who have come together to make this event such a great success over the past 3 editions. We have put India in the center of the culinary map in the world. We intend to make Young Chef Olympiad bigger, with over 100 countries for our next edition."

Padma Shri Sanjeev Kapoor who is the Mentor and Principal Judge of YCO said, “When we were studying, we didn't even know something like this existed. I am happy that students today can come here and experience something like Young Chef Olympiad. We will continue to welcome them to our country. To the international students, I say our fraternity of chefs from India will always be with you for anything you want to know about India or Indian food. I hope next year, we have 100 countries participating in Young Chef Olympiad."

Celebrity chef and technical judge, Chef Ranveer Brar said, “This year, the 3rd season of YCO was a vast leap from the earlier season in terms of organization, quality of talent, and to the overall blend of the competition. The stress was mainly on technique and culinary basics."

The celebrity mascot of YCO 17 was Masterchef Junior 2014, USA winner Logan Guleff.

Padma Shri Sanjeev Kapoor, Chef Boris Leung Yee Chung, Chef Ranveer Brar, Chef Michele Prevedello, Chef Andreas Muller, Chef Karen Anand,  Chef Avijit Ghosh, Chef Abhijit Saha and Prof. David Foskett were some of the notable judges of the Young Chef Olympaid 2017. 

17 participating International Culinary Institutes from 17 countries signed MOU with IIHM, India for exchange of ideas, students and faculty.

Season 4

The 4th International Young Chef Olympiad 2018, supported by Ministry of Tourism (India), Government of India, organized by International Institute of Hotel Management was launched on 9 November 2017 at The Hilton Double Tree Hotel in London. The launch ceremony was attended by the judges of The 4th International Young Chef Olympiad 2017. They are Chef Chris Galvin, Chef John Wood and Chef Enzo Oliveri. The adjudicators Zenobia Nadirshaw and Ron Scott along with Prof David Foskett, the chairman of the jury was also present, Dr Suborno Bose, the chairman of the Young Chef Olympiad 2018 Committee said, “The Young Chef Olympiad was conceptualised as a platform for young chefs-in- training from around the world to interact and showcase their talent. We are glad to see a great response from the international community, who have come together to make this event a great success over the past three editions. We have put India at the centre of the culinary map of the world. In future, we intend to make Young Chef Olympiad bigger with over 100 countries participating in our next edition." Participating countries was divided into number of groups in the launch ceremony. 

The 4th International Young Chef Olympiad 2018, supported by Ministry of Tourism (India), Government of India, organized by International Institute of Hotel Management was held from 28 January to 2 February across 4 cites, Delhi, Pune, Bangalore and Kolkata and saw a participation from over 50 countries around the world. The opening ceremony was held at the Talkatora  Stadium, Delhi

Th United World of Young Chef was held on 31 January 2018 evening at the Hyatt Regency, Kolkata as a fun event where all the participating countries cooked their national disk. 

The final top 10 countries were Bangladesh, Mauritius, Bhutan, Hongkong, Ireland, Malayasia, Iceland, New Zealand, South Korea and India. 

The 4th Young Chef Olympiad was won by Lai Jia Yi from Malaysia and Surya Sekhar Roy Choudhury was the runner up. Lai Jia Yi  won a cash price of USD 10,000 handed over by Padmashree Chef Sanjeev Kapoor, Chairman of Jury Prof. David Foskett and Chief Mentor of IIHM Dr. Suborno Bose. The world's biggest culinary competition was judged by eminent celebrity chefs and Michelin-starred winners including Padmashree Sanjeev Kapoor, Ranveer Brar, John Wood, Chris Galvin, Scott Baechler, and Enzo Oliveri.

References

External links
 

Hospitality industry in India
Competitions in India
Ministry of Tourism (India)